The Ager Romanus (literally, "the field of Rome"') is the geographical rural area (part plains, part hilly) that surrounds the city of Rome.  Politically and historically, it has represented the area of influence of Rome's municipal government.  It is limited to the south by the Monti Prenestini range,  Alban hills and Pontine Marshes; to the west by the Tyrrhenian Sea; to the north by the hills surrounding Lake Bracciano and to the east by the Monti Tiburtini range.

History

Ancient Rome
The Rome of Romulus and his immediate successors possessed a very restricted territory, as did neighbouring Latin cities such as Praeneste. Such territories were marked by boundary stones, or cippi, used to define and limit the legitimate area of influence of cities, and the boundaries of private landholdings. According to tradition, Rome rapidly outgrew the ager established by its founder, and rather than accept its confinement, Tullus Hostilius razed the Latin city of Alba Longa ca. 635 BC, and incorporated its former territories within the ager Romanus.

With the proclamation of the Roman Republic in 509 BC, all the territory occupied by Romans in "Latium vetus" came to be proclaimed ager publicus, equivalent to state lands today, which were held by the state and could be granted to private citizens. The Roman municipal authorities of this era were the consuls.  In effect, Rome was a gigantic city-territory continuously expanding across Europe.

Octavian Augustus founded the office of praefectus urbi and other offices which divided the administration of the city of Rome from that of the Roman Empire.  Thus was solved the problem of delimiting the territory of the municipium of Rome from the territory of the rest of the empire - besides the Regio I Latii et Campaniae administered by a specific governor, the confines of the municipal authority of Rome came to be fixed at the "centesimum lapidem" (i.e. one hundred miles) on each of the via consularis converging on Rome.  So, de iure, the Roman municipal authority controlled the whole of Lazio and part of Tuscany from Talamone to Terracina and also parts of Abruzzo and Umbria.

The same territorial division was confirmed by the re-subdivision of the provinces by Diocletian.

Medieval era
After the fall of the empire, the praefectus urbi continued to be elected and did not come to be totally deprived of their power even by the advancing papal power which effectively became the municipal government of Rome.

The Ager Romanus, as a political zone subject to the municipium of Rome, theoretically continued to extend ad centesimum lapidem, but in practice many of its regions ended up in Lombard hands, with still others managed by the religious authorities or the pope, who were beginning to manage their territories by means of patrimonia and domuscultae.

Today
The motu proprio of 6 July 1817 by Pope Pius VII established the boundaries of the municipium of Rome, assigning to the capital its present communal territory as well as the present communes of Fiumicino, Pomezia and Ardea.  The confines of the Comunità di Roma were thus finally defined and no longer nebulous, and these limits ended at the constitution of the commune of Pomezia (also including present-day Ardea) following its lasting foundation during the "bonifica fascista" and—in the 1990s—of Fiumicino.

Sources
This page is a translation of its Italian equivalent.

References

History of Lazio
Topography of the ancient city of Rome